Meadow Skipper (May 8, 1960 – 1982) was a Standardbred racehorse and sire. He earned $428,057 as a racehorse.

Background
Meadow Skipper was a brown horse foaled in 1960 by Dale Frost out of the U. S. Harness Racing Hall of Fame mare Countess Vivian by Kings Council.

Career
Trained and driven by Earle Avery, Meadow Skipper was a world or season champion during each year that he raced. He won the 1963 Cane Pace, and placed second in the Little Brown Jug.

Stud record
When he retired to the breeding farm, Meadow Skipper sired more than 1,700 progeny. As a stud, his progeny earned $66 million. He sired 456 two-minute pacers, including Triple Crown winners Ralph Hanover and Most Happy Fella; plus Albatross, sire of Niatross, Chairmanoftheboard, and Naughty But Nice.

The winnings of the 2,546 progeny of Albatross, Meadow Skipper's son, earned $130,700,280. Niatross is believed by many to be the greatest harness horse of all time. He was Harness Horse of the Year as a two- and three-year-old in 1979 and 1980, won the Triple Crown of Harness Racing for Pacers, and obliterated the world record by three full seconds with a mile time of 1:49.1.

Retirement
Meadow Skipper retired to Stoner Creek Farm in Kentucky, and died there in 1982.
In 1983, Meadow Skipper was inducted into the United States Harness Racing Hall of Fame.

Pedigree

References

1960 racehorse births
1982 racehorse deaths
United States Harness Racing Hall of Fame inductees
Harness racing in the United States
American Standardbred racehorses
Cane Pace winners